Ludmila Varmužová (also known as Ludmilla Varmuza; born 25 February 1979) is a retired tennis player who represented the Czech Republic as well as San Marino during her career.

As a junior, Varmužová appeared at the finals of all four Grand Slam girls' doubles events. She won at the Australian Open in 1994 and 1995, the French Open and the US Open in 1995, and was a finalist at Wimbledon in 1994.

After turning professional, Varmužová never qualified for the main draw of a Grand Slam championship, but she did win one ITF tournament, a $50k event at Jakarta, Indonesia, in 1996.

ITF finals

Singles (1–2)

Doubles (0–4)

Junior Grand Slam finals

Girls' doubles (4–2)

References
 
 

1979 births
Living people
Sportspeople from Zlín
Czech female tennis players
Sammarinese female tennis players
Sammarinese people of Czech descent
Czech emigrants to San Marino
Australian Open (tennis) junior champions
French Open junior champions
US Open (tennis) junior champions
Grand Slam (tennis) champions in girls' doubles